A referendum on the Federation of Arab Republics was held in Libya on 1 September 1971, alongside simultaneous referendums in Egypt and Syria. It was approved by 98.6% of voters, with a turnout of 94.6%.

Results

References

1971 in Libya
1971 referendums
Federation of Arab Republics
Referendums in Libya